Polyspirella pellucida is a species of sea snail, a marine gastropod mollusk in the family Pyramidellidae, the pyrams and their allies.

Distribution
The type species was found off Port Alfred, South Africa.

References

External links
 To World Register of Marine Species

Pyramidellidae
Gastropods described in 1897